Year 952 (CMLII) was a leap year starting on Thursday (link will display the full calendar) of the Julian calendar.

Events 
<onlyinclude>

By place

Europe 
 Summer – At the Reichstag in Augsburg (assembled by King Otto I), joined by German nobles and bishops, Berengar of Ivrea pays homage. He becomes a vassal of the East Frankish Kingdom. Otto leaves a strong garrison at Pavia in the hands of his son-in-law Conrad the Red, duke of Lotharingia.

Scotland 
 King Constantine II dies at the monastery of St. Andrews (where he has been retired since 943). His cousin and ruling monarch, Malcolm I, fights a battle against the Northmen or the Norse–Gaels.

Africa 
 Summer – Kalbid forces under Al-Hasan ibn Ali al-Kalbi (an aristocratic member of the ruling Fatimid Caliphate) sail from Sicily and invade Byzantine Calabria. He attacks several towns, including Gerace and Cassono.

Births 
 Adelaide of Aquitaine, French queen consort (or 945)
 Adela of Hamaland, Frankish countess and regent (d. 1021)
 Fakhr al-Dawla, emir of Gurgan and Tabaristan (d. 997)
 Sa'd al-Dawla, Hamdanid emir of Aleppo (d. 991)
 Song, Chinese empress consort (d. 995)

Deaths 
 June 15 – Murong Yanchao, Chinese general
 July 17 – Wu Hanyue, Chinese noblewoman (b. 913)
 September 6 – Suzaku, emperor of Japan (b. 923)
 September 10 – Gao Xingzhou, Chinese general (b. 885)
 December 17 – Hugh the Black, duke of Burgundy
date unknown
 Alan II (Wrybeard), duke of Brittany 
 Constantine II, king of Alba (Scotland)
 Li Jianxun, Chinese official and chancellor
 Mansur ibn Qara-Tegin, Samanid governor
<onlyinclude>

References